A monstrous birth, variously defined in history, is a birth in which a defect renders the animal or human child malformed to such a degree as to be considered "monstrous". Such births were often taken as omens, signs of God, or moral warnings to be wielded by society at large as a tool for manipulation in various ways. The development of the field of obstetrics helped do away with spurious associations with evil but the historical significance of these fetuses remains noteworthy. In early and medieval Christianity, monstrous births were presented as and used to pose difficult theological problems about humanity and salvation.

Overview

An early reference to monstrous birth is found in the apocryphal biblical text 2 Esdras, where it is linked to menstruation: "women in their uncleanness will bear monsters." Monstrous births are often placed in a religious context and interpreted as signs and symbols, as is evidenced in the 1493 Nuremberg Chronicle. According to David Hume's "The Natural History of Religion", they are among the first signs that arouse the barbarian's interest. Monstrous human births raise the question of the difference between humans and animals, and anthropologists have described different interpretations of and behaviors toward such births. Among the East African Nuer people, monstrous births are acted on in a way that restores the division between the categories of human and animal: "the Nuer treat monstrous births as baby hippopotamuses, accidentally born to humans, and, with this labelling, the appropriate action is clear. They gently lay them in the river where they belong."

Whether monstrous births were natural, unnatural, or supernatural remained a topic of discussion. Saint Augustine held that nothing "done by the will of God could be contrary to nature," whereas Thomas Aquinas considered some miracles to be against nature.

Medieval explanations
Reasons for monstrous births given in early medieval penitentials (concerned with sexual sin) and thirteenth-century medical texts (concerned with physical purity) include pollution through menses and intercourse during menstruation. Such explanations are found in many medieval literary texts, including Jean Maillart's fourteenth-century Roman du Comte Anjou and Geoffrey Chaucer's "Man of Law's Tale."

Early modern explanations
Sixteenth- and seventeenth-century medical texts, which treat pregnancy as a disease, suggest that monstrous births may be the result of the mother's sickness or distress, and they continue the myth of (bestial) intercourse during pregnancy as a cause. The mother's role is of the greatest importance, and what was presupposed was the possibility of an emotional transference from mother to fetus, referred to as the "theory of the maternal imagination":According to most of the authors of the sixteenth through early eighteenth centuries, an expectant mother's cravings, desires, and experiences--especially experiences that aroused strong passions such as fear and lust--were capable of directly inscribing themselves upon the body of the fetus, producing deformities and monstrosities that retained the semantic content of the original impression.

At the same time, an epistemological shift was taking place, and monstrous births changed from "signs to facts." Such births were now often publicized in pamphlets and broadsides and became the subject of scientific investigation; the early sixteenth century produced an "apparent upsurge of interest in monstrous births."

Animal births

Monstrous animal births often figure in times of religious upheaval. Many occurred in the Europe of the Reformation: the advent of Luther was supposedly announced by the 1522 birth of a monstrous calf (a mooncalf) in Saxony, and the accession of Elizabeth I of England was supposedly indicated by monstrous births as well, as a warning to "Catholics and other sinners."

Luther's mooncalf
A misshapen calf, born in Freiberg, Saxony, on 8 December 1522, quickly became important in the German Reformation. It was born with oddly shaped legs (its hind legs straight as a human's) and with a fold of skin over its head shaped like a cowl—hence its comparison to a monk. An illustration made its way to a Prague astrologer, who "discovered that the monster did indeed signify something terrible, indeed the most awful thing possible--Martin Luther." Luther himself responded quickly with a pamphlet containing a mock exegesis of the creature, Monk Calf, in which the "Monk Calf" stands, in all its monstrosity, for the Catholic church. Luther's anti-papist pamphlet appeared together with a tract by Philipp Melanchthon which discussed a fictional monster, the Pope-Ass, a hybrid between a man and a donkey supposedly found near Rome after the 1496 flood. Circulated in 1523, Martin Luther and Philipp Melanchthon's pamphlet was titled The Meaning of Two Horrific Figures, the Papal Ass at Rome and the Monk Calf Found at Freyberg in Meissen. Lucas Cranach the Elder and his workshop provided the illustrations of the Papal Ass and the Monk Calf for the pamphlet. Variations of Luther and Melanchthon's pamphlet eventually were circulated, including one that depicted the Papal Ass and the Monk Calf in “an encounter between the two creatures. This opening page adds a new phrase to the title of the book: ‘with signs of the Day of Judgement.'"

Human births

Especially monstrous births among humans were, from the early Middle Ages on, seen as signifying God's interaction with the world: "a monstrous birth is the shape of wickedness, not only the result of original sin but of more local and immediate forms as well." One of the best known examples of such births was the Monster of Ravenna.

Although the connections between a monstrous birth and improper maternal behavior were eventually dismissed by reliable authorities, a particularly late incident involving such allegations took place in the Massachusetts Bay Colony. Mary Dyer, later to become a Quaker martyr, gave birth to a deformed child in October 1637. Noted religious dissenter Anne Hutchinson, who was acquainted with the Dyer family and was present at that birth, was herself delivered of a "monster" in the next year. Both cases were publicized by John Winthrop, who was at the time bringing legal proceedings against both women for heresy.

See also

 Teratoma
 Parasitic twin
 Conjoined twins

References
Notes

Bibliography

Childbirth
Congenital disorders